Rookie Blue is a Canadian police drama television series created by Morwyn Brebner, Tassie Cameron and Ellen Vanstone. It stars Missy Peregrym as Andy McNally, Enuka Okuma as Traci Nash, Travis Milne as Chris Diaz, Charlotte Sullivan as Gail Peck, Gregory Smith as Dov Epstein and Ben Bass as Sam Swarek. The drama follows the lives of a group of police officers who have just graduated from the academy. They must not only learn to deal with their duties as police officers, but also deal with the problems and expectation of their families and friends. The series premiered on June 24, 2010 on Global in Canada. It also airs on ABC in the U.S.

The original pilot script was written by Ilana Frank, after which thirteen episodes were ordered by Canwest. Casting began in June with Missy Peregrym being cast first and Gregory Smith shortly after. Production of the first season started July 14, 2009 and continued through November 2009.

The series was renewed for a second season on July 12, 2010, after only three episodes had aired. On July 13, 2011 the show was renewed for a third season.

Three episodes into the third season, the series was renewed for a fourth season.

On July 17, 2013, the series was renewed for a fifth season. Unlike the previous 13-episode seasons, season 5 was produced in a batch of 22 episodes. On August 7, 2014, it was announced that the 11-episode second half of season five would air in 2015, instead of being aired as a full season of twenty-two episodes, as originally intended. These remaining episodes were later re-branded as season 6.

Series overview

Episodes

Season 1 (2010)

Season 2 (2011)

Season 3 (2012)

Season 4 (2013)

Season 5 (2014)

Season 6 (2015)

References

External links
  for Global
  for ABC
 
 List of Rookie Blue episodes at The Futon Critic
 List of Rookie Blue episodes at MSN TV

Lists of Canadian drama television series episodes